"Tower of Strength" is a song written by Burt Bacharach and Bob Hilliard and performed by Gene McDaniels. The record was produced by Snuff Garrett and featured the Johnny Mann Singers and Earl Palmer on drums. It appeared on his 1961 album, Tower of Strength.

Chart performance 
The song reached No. 5 on both the US Billboard chart and the R&B chart in 1961.

Other versions
Frankie Vaughan released a version as a single that peaked at No. 1 on the UK Singles Chart in 1961.
Paul Raven (later famous as 'Gary Glitter') released a version as a single in 1961.
Gloria Lynne released an answer song entitled "You Don't Have to Be a Tower of Strength" in 1961.
Adriano Celentano sung a famous Italian version with the title Stai lontana da me ("Be far away from me"), first on the Italian charts in the Summer of 1962. It was the first single Celentano recorded for his personal label, the Clan Celentano.
Also in 1962 Catullo and The Enigmists recorded the piece in Italian (Nuova Enigmistica Tascabile, N. 427).
Sue Richards  had a moderate hit with her version in 1975. 
Narvel Felts released a version as a single that went to No. 26 on the Canadian country chart and No. 33 on the country chart in 1979.
Portuguese singer Aurea also released a version of the song on her 2010 debut album Aurea.

In media
McDaniels' version was used in the 1987 movie The Year My Voice Broke.

References

1961 songs
1961 singles
1979 singles
Songs with music by Burt Bacharach
Gene McDaniels songs
Gary Glitter songs
Narvel Felts songs
Song recordings produced by Snuff Garrett
UK Singles Chart number-one singles
Liberty Records singles
Mercury Records singles
Songs written for films
Songs with lyrics by Bob Hilliard